This is a list of regencies and cities in West Sumatra province. As of October 2019, there were 12 regencies and 7 cities.

External links 

 
 
Regencies, Indonesia
Regencies and cities